Selby Baqwa was South Africa's Public Protector from 1995 to 2002 and Lawrence Mushwana took over the office.

References

Living people
Ombudsmen in South Africa
Year of birth missing (living people)